Dany Achille Nounkeu Tchounkeu (born 11 April 1986) is a Cameroonian professional footballer who plays as a centre back for Djiboutian club Arta/Solar7.

Career

Early years
Originating from the Bamileke tribe of the West Region, Nounkeu began his career at Collège Vogt Atletic in Yaoundé, and joined FC Metz in July 2005. After only appearing with the reserves in the Championnat de France amateur he moved to CSO Amnéville in the same division.

In July 2008 Nounkeu moved to fellow league team Pau FC, appearing in 24 matches in the 2008–09 campaign.

Toulouse
On 5 June 2009, Nounkeu signed a four-year deal with Ligue 1 club Toulouse FC. He made his debut as a professional on 12 September, starting and playing the full 90 minutes in a 0–0 away draw against AS Nancy Lorraine.

Nounkeu featured in 17 matches during his first season at the club (all starts, 1530 minutes of action), with his side finishing 14th.

Gaziantepspor
On 1 September 2010, Nounkeu signed a three-year deal with Turkish Süper Lig outfit Gaziantepspor, for an undisclosed fee. He played his first match for the club on 30 October, starting in a 0–0 home draw against Karabükspor.

Nounkeu featured regularly in 2011–12, appearing in 28 matches as his side finished 10th.

Galatasaray
On 8 June 2012, Nounkeu moved to Galatasaray, by agreeing to a four-year deal for a €3.3 million fee. He made his debut on 22 September, starting in a 3–1 win at Beşiktaş.

Beşiktaş (loan)
On 2 February 2014, after featuring sparingly during the 2013–14 campaign, Nounkeu was loaned Beşiktaş until June. He appeared in nine matches for the club before returning to Galatasaray when his loan expired.

Granada (loan)
On 30 August 2014, Nounkeu joined Granada in a season-long loan deal.

Bursaspor
On 30 July 2015, Nounkeu agreed with Turkish club Bursaspor for three years.

Akhisarspor
On 10 May 2018, Nounkeu helped Akhisar Belediyespor win their first professional trophy, the 2017–18 Turkish Cup.

Arta/Solar7
In December 2020, Nounkeu completed a permanent move to the Djiboutian side Arta/Solar7, where he will play alongside fellow Cameroonian, Alex Song.

International career
Nounkeu presented his homeland international at 2003 FIFA U-17 World Championship in Finland. His first call-up for the main squad was in November 2004 under Winfried Schäfer. Nounkeu took part of the LG cup in 2011 in Morocco with the Cameroon National team scoring a penalty kick against the host Morocco. After being part of Cameroon squad during the qualification campaign for the 2014 World Cup, Nounkeu was included in the final roster to take part of the tournament in Brazil, playing two out of three games for Cameroon during including one start against Croatia .

Honours
Galatasaray
Süper Lig: 2012–13
Süper Kupa (2): 2012, 2013

Akhisarspor
 Turkish Cup: 2017–18
 Süper Kupa: 2018

References

External links
 
 Interview with Foot-National *French*
 Foot-National-Profile
 

1986 births
Living people
Footballers from Yaoundé
Cameroonian footballers
Association football central defenders
Ligue 1 players
Süper Lig players
Toulouse FC players
FC Metz players
CSO Amnéville players
Pau FC players
Gaziantepspor footballers
Galatasaray S.K. footballers
Beşiktaş J.K. footballers
Granada CF footballers
Thonon Evian Grand Genève F.C. players
Bursaspor footballers
Kardemir Karabükspor footballers
Akhisarspor footballers
Cameroonian expatriate footballers
Expatriate footballers in France
Expatriate footballers in Turkey
Expatriate footballers in Djibouti
Cameroonian expatriate sportspeople in Turkey
Expatriate footballers in Spain
Cameroonian expatriate sportspeople in Spain
Cameroon international footballers
2014 FIFA World Cup players
Cameroonian expatriate sportspeople in Djibouti
Djibouti Premier League players
AS Arta/Solar7 players